Coreura interposita is a moth of the subfamily Arctiinae. It was described by George Hampson in 1901. It is found in Venezuela.

References

Euchromiina
Moths described in 1901